The Flaming Omen is a 1917 American silent drama film directed by William Wolbert and starring Gayne Whitman, Mary Anderson and Otto Lederer.

Cast
 Gayne Whitman as Dorian 
 Mary Anderson as Blanca
 Luella Smith as Violet
 Otto Lederer as Lord Haviland
 S.E. Jennings as Natche
 Clara King as Coya

References

Bibliography
 John T. Weaver. Twenty Years of Silents, 1908-1928. Scarecrow Press, 1971.

External links
 

1917 films
1917 drama films
1910s English-language films
American silent feature films
Silent American drama films
American black-and-white films
Vitagraph Studios films
Films directed by William Wolbert
1910s American films